Sadie Judith Coles  (born February 1963) is a British art dealer. She is the owner of Sadie Coles HQ, a contemporary art gallery in London, that has been at the forefront of the Young British Artists movement.

Early life
Coles was born in February 1963. She studied at Middlesex University in the early 1980s and received a degree in art history and film studies.

Career
Coles spent six years working for Anthony d'Offay, before opening her own gallery, Sadie Coles HQ in 1997.

In 2014, The Guardian named her in their "Movers and makers: the most powerful people in the art world".

Coles was appointed Officer of the Order of the British Empire (OBE) in the 2021 Birthday Honours for services to art.

Personal life
Coles is divorced from German fashion photographer Juergen Teller, with whom she has one child.

References

1963 births
Living people
Art dealers from London
Alumni of Middlesex University
Officers of the Order of the British Empire